A bījamantra, also rendered beej mantra, is a monosyllabic mantra believed to contain the essence of a given deity in Tantra and Tantric Hinduism. It is ritually uttered for the invocation of a deity, of whom it is regarded to be the true name as well as a manifestation. It is regarded to be a mystic sound made of the first few characters of a given deity's name, the chanting of which is regarded to allow an adherent to achieve a state of spiritual sanctity. These mantras are also associated with the chakras of the body.

The Romanian scholar Mircea Eliade stated that an adherent who chants the semantically meaningless bījamantra "appropriates its ontological essence, concretely and directly assimilates with the god".

Examples 
A few of the major bījamantras include:

Other notable bījamantras include:

References 

Mantras
Tantra